Carbon Trade Exchange (CTX) operates spot exchanges in multiple global environmental commodity markets, including carbon, Renewable Energy Certificates (RECs) and water. Carbon Trade Exchange allows buyers and sellers to trade voluntary credits, as well as those issued by a United Nations program established under the 1997 Kyoto Protocol.

Background

CTX was founded in London by Wayne Sharpe in 2009, after two years of research and development. CTX opened office in Sydney in 2009.

CTX uses cloud based unique technical IT infrastructure to support and operate its exchanges. CTX is currently operating in Globally in the Voluntary carbon end environmental sectors. CTX's parent company, Global Environmental Markets (GEM), has the ability to expand into other jurisdictions and markets, with licensed regulated exchange platforms .

The CTX Exchange Platform interfaces with multiple environmental commodity registries, including Gold Standard, Verra VCS and the UNFCCC CDM Registry. It also electronically links to financial intermediaries, such as Westpac in Australia, to provide efficient trading and create liquid and transparent markets.

Key people 

Wayne Sharpe, Executive Chairman
Lee Barton, Chief Operating Officer

Key partners

CTX has established relationships with various parties and companies around the world and continues to develop new relationships as it expands globally.

Current partnerships include:
Westpac
The Gold Standard
Verified Carbon Standard
IETA
CDM

References

2009 establishments in England
Emissions trading